Events of 2015 in Spain.

Incumbents
Monarch: Felipe VI
Prime Minister: Mariano Rajoy

Events
26 January - An F-16 jet belonging to the Hellenic Air Force crashes in southern Spain during a NATO exercise, killing ten people and injuring 21.

Deaths
5 January - Antonio Fuertes, 85, Spanish footballer (Valencia, Elche).
7 January 
José Arias, 92, Olympic alpine skier (1948).
Ricardo Bueno Fernández, 74, politician, member of the Senate (1977–1979, 1993–2000) and Congress of Deputies (2000–2004).
12 January - Germán Cobos, 87, actor
16 January - Pedro María Iguaran, 74, footballer (Real Sociedad).
29 January - Amparo Baró, 77, Spanish actress (Siete mesas de billar francés), cancer.
31 January - José Manuel Lara Bosch, 68, Spanish media executive, CEO of Grupo Planeta (since 2003) and Atresmedia (since 2012), pancreatic cancer.

See also
2015 in Spanish television
List of Spanish films of 2015

References

 
2010s in Spain
Years of the 21st century in Spain
Spain
Spain